The 1987 Hardy Cup was the 1987 edition of the Canadian intermediate senior ice hockey championship.

Final
Best of 5
Miramichi 7 Stony Plain 2
Miramichi 7 Stony Plain 3
Miramichi 7 Stony Plain 5
Miramichi Packers beat Stony Plain Eagles 3–0 on series.

External links
Hockey Canada

Hardy Cup
Hardy